Geophis pyburni, also known as Pyburn's earth snake, is a species of snake in the colubrid family. It is endemic to Mexico. It is only known from its type locality, Rancho La Pastilla in the Sierra de Coalcoman, Michoacan.

Etymology
The specific name, pyburni, is in honor of American herpetologist  (1927–2007).

Description
Geophis pyburni measure  in total length. Tail makes 13–16 % of the total length. The dorsum is dark brown, becoming lighter laterally.

References

Geophis
Snakes of North America
Endemic reptiles of Mexico
Reptiles described in 1977
Taxa named by Jonathan A. Campbell